Christina Moberg (born 1947) is a Swedish chemist who is a Professor of Organic Chemistry at the KTH Royal Institute of Technology. She was elected an Honorary Fellow of the Royal Society of Chemistry in 2017.

Early life and education 
Moberg was born in Sweden. She attended Stockholm University for her graduate studies, where she studied chemistry and graduated in 1975. She completed her doctoral studies at the KTH Royal Institute of Technology. Her doctorate considered nickelocene, cobaltocene and cyclopentadienyl (tributylphosphine)-copper in organic synthesis. After earning her doctorate, Moberg moved to the Pierre and Marie Curie University (then University of Paris 6), where she worked with Jean Normant. She returned to the KTH Royal Institute of Technology in 1967, joining the laboratory of Björn Åkermark.

Research and career 
In 1978, Moberg was appointed to the faculty at the KTH Royal Institute of Technology, where she was promoted to Full Professor in 1997. Her research considers organic synthesis. She is particularly interested in asymmetric synthesis and the creation of molecules with non-superimposable mirror symmetry. 

Alongside her work in asymmetric synthesis, Moberg is interested in supramolecular chemistry. In an interview with the European Academies' Science Advisory Council (EASAC), Moberg explained “... if you think of atoms as letters, then molecules are words. A supra-molecule is a whole sentence, because it’s made of separate molecules which interact,”.

Awards and honours 
 1998 Elected to the Royal Swedish Academy of Sciences
 1998 Göran Gustafsson Prize
 1999 L'Ordre National de Merite
 1998 Elected to the Royal Swedish Academy of Engineering Sciences
 2001 University of Gothenburg Sixten Heyman
 2006 Uppsala University Ulla och Stig Holmquist
 2013 Elected to the Danish National Research Foundation
 2015 Appointed President of the Royal Swedish Academy of Sciences 
 2016 Swedish royal family the King's Medal
 2017 Elected an Honorary Fellow of the Royal Society of Chemistry
 2017 Elected to the European Academy of Sciences and Arts
 2020 Elected President of the European Academies' Science Advisory Council

Selected publications

References 

1947 births
Living people
Swedish chemists
KTH Royal Institute of Technology alumni
Academic staff of the KTH Royal Institute of Technology
Fellows of the Royal Society of Chemistry
Swedish women chemists